Peroxisomal 2,4-dienoyl-CoA reductase is an enzyme that in humans is encoded by the DECR2 gene.

References

Further reading